Jodi McAlister is an Australian author and academic. She has published seven books, including contemporary romance and young adult fiction and two academic works regarding romance and literature.

Biography 
McAlister was born in New South Wales, Australia. She has a PhD in representations of love in popular culture and fiction. She is a senior lecturer at Deakin University. McAlister is the vice-president of the International Association for the Study of Popular Romance. She is a regular commentator on popular culture, romance fiction, and reality television.

Works

Novels

Valentine Series

Others 

 
 
 Can I Steal You For A Second? (upcoming)

Academic Works

References

External links 

 Jodi McAlister's website
 Dr Jodi McAlister - Deakin University

Living people
Women writers of young adult literature
Year of birth missing (living people)
Academic staff of Deakin University
21st-century Australian novelists
Writers from New South Wales
21st-century Australian women writers
Australian women novelists
Australian romantic fiction writers